In mathematics, the Zassenhaus algorithm
is a method to calculate a basis for the intersection and sum of two subspaces of a vector space.
It is named after Hans Zassenhaus, but no publication of this algorithm by him is known. It is used in computer algebra systems.

Algorithm

Input 

and

Finally, let  be linearly independent vectors so that  and  can be written as

and

Output 

The algorithm computes the base of the sum  and a base of the intersection .

Algorithm 

The algorithm creates the following block matrix of size :

Using elementary row operations, this matrix is transformed to the row echelon form. Then, it has the following shape:

Here,  stands for arbitrary numbers, and the vectors 

Then  with
 
is a basis of 
 

Proof of correctness 

First, we define  to be the projection to the first component.

Let

Then  and
.

Therefore, .

Because the matrix is in row echelon form, they are also linearly independent.

Example 

Using the standard basis, we create the following matrix of dimension :

Using elementary row operations, we transform this matrix into the following matrix:
 (Some entries have been replaced by "" because they are irrelevant to the result.)

Therefore

See also 
 Gröbner basis

References

External links 
 

Algorithms
Linear algebra